Frank Leander Sundstrom (January 5, 1901 – May 23, 1980) was an American Republican Party politician who represented  for three terms from 1943 to 1949.

Early life and education
Born in Massena, New York on January 5, 1901 to a Swedish immigrant father, Sundstrom attended the public schools.

Early career
He was a newspaper reporter and editor from 1918 to 1920 before attending Cornell University. While a tackle for the Cornell football team, they were undefeated in 24 games over three seasons. Sundstrom graduated in 1924. During his senior year, Sundstrom was elected to the Sphinx Head Society. He went on serve as assistant coach for the Indiana University (Bloomington) football team for one season in 1924. Sundstrom was inducted into the College Football Hall of Fame in 1978.

Sundstrom engaged in the banking and brokerage business in New York City from 1925 to 1969 and became chairman of the East Orange, New Jersey Republican Committee (1940–1946).

Congress
He was elected as a Republican to the Seventy-eighth, Seventy-ninth and Eightieth Congresses, serving in office from January 3, 1943 to January 3, 1949. He was an unsuccessful candidate for reelection in 1948 to the Eighty-first Congress.

Later career and death
After his term in Congress, he was vice president and director of Schenley Distillers (1954–1969); vice president and director of public relations for Schenley Industries, Inc. (1955–1969); vice president of the Tobacco Institute (1969–1976); and a consultant for a group of United States distillers (1976–1980).

Sundstrom resided in Chatham Borough, New Jersey, until his death in Summit, New Jersey on May 23, 1980. He was interred in Restland Memorial Park in East Hanover, New Jersey.

References

Sources

 
 

1901 births
1980 deaths
20th-century American politicians
American football tackles
American people of Swedish descent
Cornell Big Red football players
Indiana Hoosiers football coaches
College Football Hall of Fame inductees
People from Chatham Borough, New Jersey
Politicians from East Orange, New Jersey
People from Massena, New York
Republican Party members of the United States House of Representatives from New Jersey